The Convair B-36 "Peacemaker" is a strategic bomber that was built by Convair and operated by the United States Air Force (USAF) from 1949 to 1959. The B-36 is the largest mass-produced piston-engined aircraft ever built. The B-36 was the first bomber capable of delivering any of the nuclear weapons in the U.S. arsenal from an internal bomb bay without aircraft modifications.

Entering service in 1948, the B-36 was the primary nuclear weapons delivery vehicle of Strategic Air Command (SAC) until it was replaced by the jet-powered Boeing B-52 Stratofortress beginning in 1955. All but four aircraft have been scrapped.

Development

The genesis of the B-36 can be traced to early 1941, prior to the entry of the United States into World War II. At the time, the threat existed that Britain might fall to the German "Blitz", making a strategic bombing effort by the United States Army Air Corps (USAAC) against Germany impossible with the aircraft of the time.

The United States would need a new class of bomber that would reach Europe and return to bases in North America, necessitating a combat range of at least , the length of a Gander, Newfoundland–Berlin round trip. The USAAC therefore sought a bomber of truly intercontinental range, similar to the German Reichsluftfahrtministerium's (RLM) ultralong-range Amerikabomber program, the subject of a 33-page proposal submitted to Reichsmarschall Hermann Göring on 12 May 1942.

World War II and after

As the Pacific war progressed, the USAAF increasingly needed a bomber capable of reaching Japan from its bases in Hawaii, and the development of the B-36 resumed in earnest. Secretary of War Henry L. Stimson, in discussions with high-ranking officers of the USAAF, decided to waive normal army procurement procedures, and on 23 July 1943 – some 15 months after the Germans' Amerikabomber proposal's submission made it to their RLM authority, and coincidentally, the same day that, in Germany, the RLM had ordered the Heinkel firm to design a six-engined version of their own, BMW 801E powered Amerikabomber design proposal – the USAAF submitted a "letter of intent" to Convair, ordering an initial production run of 100 B-36s before the completion and testing of the two prototypes. The first delivery was due in August 1945, and the last in October 1946, but Consolidated (by this time renamed Convair after its 1943 merger with Vultee Aircraft) delayed delivery. The aircraft was unveiled on 20 August 1945 (three months after V-E Day), and flew for the first time on 8 August 1946.

After the establishment of an independent United States Air Force in 1947, the beginning in earnest of the Cold War with the 1948 Berlin Airlift, and the 1949 atmospheric test of the first Soviet atomic bomb, American military planners sought bombers capable of delivering the very large and heavy first-generation atomic bombs.

The B-36 was the only American aircraft with the range and payload to carry such bombs from airfields on American soil to targets in the USSR. The modification to allow the use of larger atomic weapons on the B-36 was called the "Grand Slam Installation".

The B-36 was arguably obsolete from the outset, being piston-powered, coupled with the widespread introduction of first-generation jet fighters in potential enemy air forces. However, its jet rival, the Boeing B-47 Stratojet, which did not become fully operational until 1953, lacked the range to attack the Soviet homeland from North America without aerial refueling and could not carry the huge first-generation Mark 16 hydrogen bomb.

The other American piston bombers of the day, the B-29 and B-50, were also too limited in range to be part of America's developing nuclear arsenal. Intercontinental ballistic missiles did not become sufficiently reliable until the early 1960s. Until the Boeing B-52 Stratofortress became operational in 1955, the B-36, as the only truly intercontinental bomber, continued to be the primary nuclear weapons delivery vehicle of the SAC.

Convair touted the B-36 as the "aluminum overcast", a so-called "long rifle" giving SAC truly global reach. During General Curtis LeMay's tenure as head of SAC (1949–57), the B-36, through intense crew training and development, formed the heart of the Strategic Air Command. Its maximum payload was more than four times that of the B-29, and exceeded that of the B-52.

Moreover, the B-36 was believed to have "an ace up its sleeve": a phenomenal cruising altitude for a piston-driven aircraft, made possible by its huge wing area and six 28-cylinder engines, putting it out of range of most of the interceptors of the day, as well as ground-based anti-aircraft guns.

Experimentals and prototypes
Consolidated Vultee Aircraft Corporation (later Convair) and Boeing Aircraft Company took part in the competition, with Consolidated winning a tender on 16 October 1941. Consolidated asked for a $15 million contract with $800,000 for research and development, mockup, and tooling. Two experimental bombers were proposed, the first to be delivered in 30 months, and the second within another six months. Originally designated Model B-35, the name was changed to B-36 to avoid confusion with the Northrop YB-35 piston-engined flying-wing bomber, against which the B-36 was meant to compete for a production contract.

Throughout its development, the B-36 program encountered delays. When the United States entered World War II, Consolidated was ordered to slow B-36 development and greatly increase Consolidated B-24 Liberator production. The first mockup was inspected on 20 July 1942, following six months of refinements. A month after the inspection, the project was moved from San Diego, California, to Fort Worth, Texas, which set back development several months. Consolidated changed the tail from a twin-tail to a single, thereby saving , but this change delayed delivery by 120 days.

Changes in the USAAF requirements did add back any weight saved in redesigns, and cost more time. A new antenna system needed to be designed to accommodate an ordered radio and radar system. The Pratt and Whitney engines were redesigned, adding another .

Design

The B-36 took shape as an aircraft of immense proportions. It was two-thirds longer than the previous "superbomber", the B-29. The wingspan and tail height of the B-36 exceeded those of the 1960s Soviet Union's Antonov An-22, the largest ever propeller-driven aircraft put into production. Only with the advent of the Boeing 747 and the Lockheed C-5 Galaxy, both designed two decades later, did American aircraft capable of lifting a heavier payload become commonplace.

The wings of the B-36 were large even when compared with present-day aircraft, exceeding, for example, those of the C-5 Galaxy, and enabled the B-36 to carry enough fuel to fly the intended long missions without refueling. The wing area permitted cruising altitudes well above the operating ceiling of any 1940s-era operational piston and jet-turbine fighters.

The large wing area and the option of starting the four jet engines supplementing the piston engines in later versions gave the B-36 a wide margin between stall speed (VS) and maximum speed (Vmax) at these altitudes. This made the B-36 more maneuverable at high altitude than the USAF jet interceptors of the day, which either could not fly above , or if they did, were likely to stall out when trying to maneuver or fire their guns. The USAF declined the invitation from the U.S. Navy for a fly-off between the Banshee and the B-36. Later, the new Secretary of Defense, Louis A. Johnson, who considered the U.S. Navy and naval aviation essentially obsolete in favor of the USAF and SAC, forbade putting the Navy's claim to the test.

The propulsion system of the B-36 was unique, with six 28-cylinder Pratt & Whitney R-4360 Wasp Major radial engines mounted in an unusual pusher configuration, rather than the conventional four-engine, tractor propeller layout of other heavy bombers. While early B-36s required long takeoff runs, this situation was improved with later versions, delivering a significantly increased power output of  total. Each engine drove a three-bladed propeller,  in diameter, mounted in the pusher configuration, thought to be the second-largest diameter propeller design ever used to power a piston-engined aircraft (after that of the Linke-Hofmann R.II). This unusual configuration prevented propeller turbulence from interfering with airflow over the wing, but could also lead to engine overheating due to insufficient airflow around the engines, resulting in inflight engine fires.

The large, slow-turning propellers interacted with the high-pressure airflow behind the wings to produce an easily recognizable very-low-frequency pulse at ground level that betrayed approaching flights.

Addition of jet propulsion
Beginning with the B-36D, Convair added a pair of General Electric J47-19 jet engines suspended near the end of each wing; these were also retrofitted to all extant B-36Bs. Consequently, the B-36 was configured to have 10 engines, six radial propeller engines and four jet engines, leading to the B-36 slogan of "six turnin' and four burnin' ". The B-36 had more engines than any other mass-produced aircraft. The jet pods greatly improved takeoff performance and dash speed over the target. In normal cruising flight, the jet engines were shut down to conserve fuel. When the jet engines were shut down, louvers closed off the front of the pods to reduce drag and to prevent ingestion of sand and dirt. The jet engine louvers were opened and closed by the flight crew in the cockpit, whether the B-36 was on the ground or in the air.

Crew
The B-36 had a crew of 15. As in the B-29 and B-50, the pressurized flight deck and crew compartment were linked to the rear compartment by a pressurized tunnel through the bomb bay. In the B-36, movement through the tunnel was on a wheeled trolley, pulling on a rope. The rear compartment featured six bunks and a dining galley and led to the tail turret.

Landing gear

These tires placed so much ground pressure on runways that the XB-36 was restricted to Carswell Field adjacent to the factory in Texas, Eglin Field in Florida, and Fairfield-Suisun Field in California. At the suggestion of General Henry H. Arnold, the single-wheel gear was soon replaced by a four-wheeled bogie. At one point, a tank-like tracked landing gear was also tried on the XB-36, but it proved heavy and noisy. The tracked landing gear was quickly abandoned.

Weaponry

The B-36 was not designed with nuclear weapons in mind, because the mere existence of such weapons was top secret during the period when the B-36 was conceived and designed (1941–46). Nevertheless, the B-36 stepped into its nuclear delivery role immediately upon becoming operational. In all respects except speed, the B-36 could match what was arguably its approximate Soviet counterpart, the turboprop-powered Tu-95, which began production in January 1956 and is still in active service . Carrying this massive weapon required merging two adjacent bomb bays.

The defensive armament consisted of six remote-controlled retractable gun turrets, and fixed tail and nose turrets. Each turret was fitted with two 20 mm cannon, for a total of 16. Recoil vibration from gunnery practice often caused the aircraft's electrical wiring to jar loose or the vacuum tube electronics to malfunction, leading to failure of the aircraft controls and navigation equipment; this contributed to the crash of B-36B 44-92035 on 22 November 1950.

The Convair B-36 was the only aircraft designed to carry the T-12 Cloudmaker, a gravity bomb weighing  and designed to produce an earthquake bomb effect.

The first prototype XB-36 flew on 8 August 1946. The speed and range of the prototype failed to meet the standards set out by the USAAC in 1941. This was expected, as the Pratt & Whitney R-4360 engines required were not yet available, and the qualified workers and materials needed to install them were lacking.

A second aircraft, the YB-36, flew on 4 December 1947. It had a redesigned, high-visibility, yet still "greenhouse-like" bubble canopy, heavily framed due to its substantial size, which was later adopted for production, and the engines used on the YB-36 were more powerful and more efficient. Altogether, the YB-36 was much closer to the production aircraft.

The first 21 B-36As were delivered in 1948. They were interim airframes, intended for crew training and later conversion. No defensive armament was fitted, since none was ready. Once later models were available, all B-36As were converted to RB-36E reconnaissance models. The first B-36 variant meant for normal operation was the B-36B, delivered beginning in November 1948. This aircraft met all the 1941 requirements, but had serious problems with engine reliability and maintenance (changing the 336 spark plugs was a task dreaded by ground crews) and with the availability of armaments and spare parts. Later models featured more powerful variants of the R-4360 engine, improved radar, and redesigned crew compartments.

The four jet engines increased fuel consumption and reduced range. Gun turrets were already recognized as obsolete, and newer bombers had been limited to just a tail turret, or no gunners at all for several years but the development of several air-to-air missiles, including the Soviet K-5 which began test firings in 1951, eliminated the last justifications for keeping them.
In February 1954, the USAF awarded Convair a contract for a new "Featherweight" design program, which significantly reduced weight and crew size. The three configurations were:
 Featherweight I removed defensive hardware, including the six gun turrets.
 Featherweight II removed the rear compartment crew comfort features, and all hardware accommodating the McDonnell XF-85 Goblin parasite fighter.
 Featherweight III incorporated both configurations I and II.
The six turrets eliminated by Featherweight I reduced the aircraft's crew from 15 to 9. Featherweight III had a longer range and an operating ceiling of at least , especially valuable for reconnaissance missions.

Production of the B-36 ceased in 1954.

Operating and financial problems
Due to problems that occurred with the B-36 in its early stages of testing, development, and later in service, some critics referred to the aircraft as a "billion-dollar blunder". In particular, the United States Navy saw it as a costly bungle, diverting congressional funding and interest from naval aviation and aircraft carriers in general, and carrier–based nuclear bombers in particular. In 1947, the Navy attacked congressional funding for the B-36, alleging it failed to meet Pentagon requirements. The Navy held to the pre-eminence of the aircraft carrier in the Pacific during World War II, presuming carrier-based aircraft would be decisive in future wars. To this end, the Navy designed , a "supercarrier" capable of launching huge fleets of tactical aircraft or nuclear bombers. It then pushed to have funding transferred from the B-36 to USS United States. The Air Force successfully defended the B-36 project, and United States was officially cancelled by Secretary of Defense Louis A. Johnson in a cost-cutting move over the objections of both Secretary of the Navy John L. Sullivan and the Navy's senior uniformed leadership. Sullivan resigned in protest and was replaced as Secretary of the Navy by Francis P. Matthews, who had limited familiarity with defense issues, but was a close friend of Johnson. Several high-level Navy officials questioned the government's decision in cancelling the United States to fund the B-36, alleging a conflict of interest because Johnson had once served on Convair's board of directors. The uproar following the cancellation of United States in 1949 was nicknamed the "Revolt of the Admirals", during which time Matthews dismissed and forced into retirement the serving Chief of Naval Operations (CNO), Admiral Louis E. Denfeld, following Denfeld's testimony before the House Armed Services Committee.

The congressional and media furor over the firing of Admiral Denfeld, as well as the significant use of aircraft carriers in the Korean War, resulted in the Truman administration subsequently ousting both Johnson and Matthews in their respective secretary roles, and in the design and procurement of the subsequent of supercarriers, which were of comparable size to United States, but with a design geared towards greater multirole use with composite air wings of fighter, attack, reconnaissance, electronic warfare, early warning and antisubmarine-warfare aircraft. At the same time, heavy manned bombers for the SAC were also deemed crucial to national defense and, as a result, the two systems were never again in competition for the same budgetary resources.

Operational history

The B-36, including its GRB-36, RB-36, and XC-99 variants, was in USAF service as part of the SAC from 1948 to 1959. The RB-36 variants of the B-36 were used for reconnaissance during the Cold War with the Soviet Union and the B-36 bomber variants conducted training and test operations and stood ground and airborne alert, but the latter variants were never used offensively as bombers against hostile forces; they never fired a shot in combat.

Maintenance

The Wasp Major engines had a prodigious appetite for lubricating oil; each engine required a dedicated 100-gal (380-l) tank. Normal maintenance consisted of tedious measures, such as changing the 56 spark plugs on each of the six engines; the plugs were often fouled by the lead in the 145 octane antiknock fuel required by the R-4360 engines. Thus, each service required changing 336 spark plugs. Another frequent maintenance job was replacing the dozens of bomb bay light bulbs, which routinely shattered during test firing of the turret guns.

The B-36 was too large to fit in most hangars. Since even an aircraft with the range of the B-36 needed to be stationed as close to enemy targets as possible, this meant the plane was largely based in the extreme weather locations of the northern continental United States, Alaska, and the Arctic. Special shelters were built so the maintenance crews could be given a modicum of protection. Ground crews were at risk of slipping and falling from icy wings, or being blown off the wings by propeller wash running in reverse pitch. This was possible only at altitudes not requiring pressurization.

In 1950, Convair (then still Consolidated-Vultee) developed streamlined pods, looking like oversize drop tanks, that were mounted on each side of the B-36's fuselage to carry spare engines between bases. Each pod could airlift two engines. When the pods were empty, they were removed and carried in the bomb bays. No record was made of the special engine pods ever being used.

Engine fires

As engine fires occurred with the B-36's radial engines, some crews humorously changed the aircraft's slogan from "six turning, four burning" into "two turning, two burning, two smoking, two choking and two more unaccounted for". This problem was exacerbated by the propellers' pusher configuration, which increased carburetor icing. The design of the R-4360 engine tacitly assumed that it would be mounted in the conventional tractor configuration—propeller/air intake/28 cylinders/carburetor—with air flowing in that order. In this configuration, the carburetor is bathed in warmed air flowing past the engine, so it is unlikely to ice up. However, the R-4360 engines in the B-36 were mounted backwards, in the pusher configuration—air intake/carburetor/28 cylinders/propeller. The carburetor was now in front of the engine, so it could not benefit from engine heat. This placement also made more traditional short-term carburetor heat systems unsuitable. Hence, when intake air was cold and humid, ice gradually obstructed the carburetor air intake, which in turn gradually increased the richness of the air/fuel mixture until the unburned fuel in the exhaust caught fire. Three engine fires of this nature led to the first loss of an American nuclear weapon when a B-36 crashed in February 1950.

Crew experience

Training missions were typically in two parts, a 40-hour flight—followed by time on the ground for refueling and maintenance—and then a 24-hour second flight. With a sufficiently light load, the B-36 could fly at least 10,000 mi (16,000 km) nonstop, and the highest cruising speed of any version, the B-36J-III, was at 230 mph (380 km/h). Engaging the jet engines could raise the cruising speed to over 400 mph (650 km/h). Hence, a 40-hour mission, with the jets used only for takeoff and climbing, flew about 9,200 mi (15,000 km).

Due to its massive size, the B-36 was never considered sprightly or agile; Lieutenant General James Edmundson likened it to "sitting on your front porch and flying your house around". Crew compartments were nonetheless cramped, especially when occupied for 24 hours by a crew of 15 in full flight kit.

War missions would have been one-way, taking off from forward bases in Alaska or Greenland, overflying the USSR, and landing in Europe, Morocco, or the Middle East. Veteran crews recall feeling confident in their ability to fly the planned missions, but not to survive weapon delivery, as the aircraft may not have been fast enough to escape the blast. These concerns were borne out by the 1954 Operation Castle tests, in which B-36s were flown at the combat distance from the detonations of bombs in the 15-megaton range. At distances believed typical of wartime delivery, aircraft suffered extensive flash and blast damage.

Experiments

The B-36 was employed in a variety of aeronautical experiments throughout its service life. Its immense size, range, and payload capacity lent itself to use in research and development programs. These included nuclear propulsion studies, and "parasite" programs in which the B-36 carried smaller interceptors or reconnaissance aircraft.

In May 1946, the Air Force began the Nuclear Energy for the Propulsion of Aircraft project, which was followed in May 1951 by the Aircraft Nuclear Propulsion (ANP) program. The ANP program used modified B-36s to study shielding requirements for an airborne reactor to determine whether a nuclear-powered aircraft was feasible. Convair modified two B-36s under the MX-1589 project. The Nuclear Test Aircraft was a B-36H-20-CF (serial number 51-5712) that had been damaged in a tornado at Carswell AFB on 1 September 1952. A number of large air intake and exhaust holes were installed in the sides and bottom of the aircraft's rear fuselage to cool the reactor in flight. On the ground, a crane would be used to remove the  reactor from the aircraft. To protect the crew, the highly modified cockpit was encased in lead and rubber, with a  leaded glass windshield. The reactor was operational, but did not power the aircraft; its sole purpose was to investigate the effect of radiation on aircraft systems. Between 1955 and 1957, the NB-36H completed 47 test flights and 215 hours of flight time, during 89 of which the reactor was critical.

Other experiments involved providing the B-36 with its own fighter defense in the form of parasite aircraft carried partially or wholly in a bomb bay. One parasite aircraft was the diminutive McDonnell XF-85 Goblin, which docked using a trapeze system. The concept was tested successfully using a B-29 carrier, but docking proved difficult even for experienced test pilots. Moreover, the XF-85 was seen as no match for contemporary foreign powers' newly developed interceptor aircraft in development and in service; consequently, the project was cancelled.

More successful was the FICON project, involving a modified B-36 (called a GRB-36D "mothership") and the RF-84K, a fighter modified for reconnaissance, in a bomb bay. The GRB-36D would ferry the RF-84K to the vicinity of the objective, whereupon the RF-84K would disconnect and begin its mission. Ten GRB-36Ds and 25 RF-84Ks were built and had limited service in 1955–1956.

Projects Tip Tow and Tom-Tom involved docking F-84s to the wingtips of B-29s and B-36s. The hope was that the increased aspect ratio of the combined aircraft would result in a greater range. Project Tip Tow was cancelled when an EF-84D and a specially modified test EB-29A crashed, killing everyone on both aircraft. This accident was attributed to the EF-84D flipping over onto the wing of the EB-29A. Project Tom-Tom, involving RF-84Fs and a GRB-36D from the FICON project (redesignated JRB-36F), continued for a few months after this crash, but was also cancelled due to the violent turbulence induced by the wingtip vortices of the B-36.

Strategic reconnaissance

One of the SAC's initial missions was to plan strategic aerial reconnaissance on a global scale. The first efforts were in photo-reconnaissance and mapping. Along with the photo-reconnaissance mission, a small electronic intelligence cadre was operating. Weather reconnaissance was part of the effort, as was long-range detection, the search for Soviet atomic explosions. In the late 1940s, strategic intelligence on Soviet capabilities and intentions was scarce. Before the development of the Lockheed U-2 high-altitude spy plane and Corona orbital reconnaissance satellites, technology and politics limited American reconnaissance efforts to the borders, and not the heartland, of the Soviet Union.

One of the essential criteria of the early postwar reconnaissance aircraft was the ability to cruise above , a level determined by knowledge of the capability of Soviet air-defense radar. The main Soviet air-defense radar in the 1950s was the American-supplied SCR-270, or locally made copies, which were only effective up to in theory, an aircraft cruising above this level would remain undetected.

The first aircraft to put this theory to the test was the RB-36D specialized photo-reconnaissance version of the B-36D. It was outwardly identical to the standard B-36D, but carried a crew of 22 rather than 15, the additional crew members being needed to operate and maintain the photo-reconnaissance equipment that was carried. The forward bomb bay in the bomber was replaced by a pressurized, manned compartment that was filled with 14 cameras. This compartment included a small darkroom, where a photo technician could develop the film. The second bomb bay contained up to 80 T-86 photoflash bombs, while the third bay could carry an extra , droppable fuel tank. The fourth bomb bay carried electronic countermeasure equipment. The defensive armament of 16 M-24A-1 20-mm cannons was retained. The extra fuel tanks increased the flight endurance to up to 50 hours. Later, a lightweight version of this aircraft, the RB-36-III, could even reach . RB-36s were distinguished by the bright aluminum finish of the camera compartment (contrasting with the dull magnesium of the rest of the fuselage) and by a series of radar domes under the aft fuselage, varying in number and placement. When developed, it was the only American aircraft having enough range to fly over the Eurasian land mass from bases in the United States, and large enough to carry the bulky, high-resolution cameras of the day.

The standard RB-36D carried up to 23 cameras, primarily K-17C, K-22A, K-38, and K-40 cameras. A special 240-inch focal length camera (known as the Boston Camera after the university where it was designed) was tested on 44-92088, the aircraft being redesignated ERB-36D. The long focal length was achieved by using a two-mirror reflection system. The camera and the contact print of this test can be seen at the National Museum of the United States Air Force at Wright Patterson AFB.

The first RB-36D (44-92088) made its initial flight on 18 December 1949, only six months after the first B-36D had flown. It initially flew without the turbojets. The 28th Strategic Reconnaissance Wing based at Rapid City AFB (later renamed Ellsworth AFB), South Dakota, received its first RB-36D on 3 June 1950. Due to severe material shortages, the new RB-36Ds did not become operationally ready until June 1951. The 24th and last RB-36D was delivered in May 1951. A total of 24 RB-36Ds was built. Some RB-36Ds were later modified to the featherweight configuration, in which all but the tail guns were removed. The crew was reduced from 22 to 19. These aircraft were redesignated as RB-36D-III. Modifications were carried out by Convair from February to November 1954.

Although on-board equipment indicated detection by Soviet radar, interceptions at the B-36's service ceiling would have remained difficult. RB-36 aircraft operating from RAF Sculthorpe in England made a number of overflights of Soviet Arctic bases, particularly the new nuclear weapons test complex at Novaya Zemlya. RB-36s performed a number of rarely acknowledged reconnaissance missions and are believed to have frequently penetrated Chinese (and Soviet) airspace under the direction of General Curtis LeMay.

In early 1950, Convair began converting B-36As to a reconnaissance configuration; included in the conversions was the sole YB-36 (42-13571). These converted examples were all redesignated RB-36E. The six R-4360-25 engines were replaced by six R-4360-41s. They were also equipped with the four J-47 jet engines that were fitted to the RB-36D. Its normal crew was 22, which included five gunners to man the 16 M-24A-1 20-mm cannon. The last conversion was completed in July 1951. Later, the USAF also bought 73 long-range reconnaissance versions of the B-36H under the designation RB-36H; 23 were accepted during the first six months of 1952, and the last were delivered by September 1953. More than a third of all B-36s were reconnaissance models.

Advances in Soviet air defense systems meant that the RB-36 became limited to flying outside the borders of the Soviet Union, as well as Eastern Europe. By the mid-1950s, the jet-powered Boeing RB-47E was able to pierce Soviet airspace and conduct a variety of spectacular overflights of the Soviet Union. Some of these flights probed deep into the heart of the Soviet Union, taking photographic and radar recordings of the route attacking SAC bombers would follow to reach their targets. Flights that involved penetrating mainland Russia were termed sensitive intelligence (SENSINT) missions.

As with the strategic bombardment versions, the RB-36 was phased out of the SAC inventory beginning in 1956, the last being sent to Davis–Monthan Air Force Base in January 1959.

Obsolescence

With the appearance of the Soviet Mikoyan-Gurevich MiG-15 in combat over North Korea in 1950, USAF propeller-driven bombers were rendered obsolete as strategic offensive weapons. Both the B-36 and the B-29/B-50 Superfortresses were designed during World War II, prior to the jet age. A new generation of swept-wing jet bombers, able to fly higher and faster, was needed to effectively overcome the MiG-15 or subsequent Soviet interceptors if the Cold War escalated into armed conflict. In 1952, while the Korean War was still in full combat, the Convair YB-60, developed from the B-36, entered a design competition with the Boeing YB-52. By early 1953, the Boeing product had emerged as the preferred design.

After fighting in Korea had ceased, President Eisenhower called for a "new look" at national defense. His administration chose to invest in the USAF, especially SAC, retiring nearly all of its B-29/B-50s in favour of the new B-47 Stratojet, introduced in 1951. By 1955, the B-52 Stratofortress was entering the inventory in substantial numbers, which replaced B-36s.

Two major factors contributing to the obsolescence of the B-36 and its phaseout were a lack of aerial refueling capability (instead requiring intermediate refueling bases to reach planned targets deep in the Soviet Union) and its slow speed (making it vulnerable to jet interceptors and thus severely decreasing its likelihood of reaching targets in Soviet territory).

The scrapping of B-36s began in February 1956. Once replaced by B-52s, they were flown directly from operational squadrons to Davis–Monthan AFB, Arizona, where the Mar-Pak Corporation handled their reclamation and destruction. Defense cutbacks in FY 1958 compelled the B-52 procurement process to be stretched out and the B-36 service life to be extended. The B-36s remaining in service were supported with components scavenged from aircraft sent to Davis–Monthan. Further update work was undertaken by Convair at San Diego (Specialized Aircraft Maintenance, SAM-SAC) until 1957 to extend the life and capabilities of the B-36s. By December 1958, only 22 B-36Js were still operational.

On 12 February 1959, the last B-36J built, AF Ser. No. 52-2827, left Biggs AFB, Texas, where it had been on duty with the 95th Heavy Bombardment Wing, and was flown to Amon Carter Field in Fort Worth, where it was put on display. Within two years, all B-36s, except five used for museum display, had been scrapped at Davis–Monthan AFB.

Variants

XB-36
Prototype powered by six  R-4360-25 engines and unarmed, one built.
YB-36
Prototype, s/n 42-13571, with modified nose and raised cockpit roof, one built later converted to YB-36A.
YB-36A
Former YB-36 with modified four-wheel landing gear, later modified as a RB-36E.
B-36A
Production variant, unarmed, used for training, 22 built, all but one converted to RB-36E.
XC-99
A cargo/transport version of the B-36. One built.
B-36B
Armed production variant with six  R-4360-41 engines, 73 built, later conversions to RB-36D and B-36D.
RB-36B
Designation for 39 B-36Bs temporarily fitted with a camera installation.
YB-36C
Projected variant of the B-36B with six  R-4360-51 engines driving tractor propellers, not built.
B-36C
Production version of the YB-36, completed as B-36Bs.
B-36D
Same as B-36B, but fitted with four J47-GE-19 engines, two each in two underwing pods, 22 built and 64 conversions from B-36B.
RB-36D
Strategic reconnaissance variant with two bomb bays fitted with camera installation, 17 built and seven conversions from B-36B.
GRB-36D
Same as RB-36D, but modified to carry a GRF-84F Thunderstreak on a ventral trapeze as part of the FICON program, 10 modified.
RB-36E
The YB-36A and 21 B-36As converted to RB-36D standards.
B-36F
Same as B-36D, but fitted with six  R-4360-53 engines and four J47-GE-19 engines, 34 built.
RB-36F
Strategic reconnaissance variant of the B-36F with additional fuel capacity, 24 built.
YB-36G
See YB-60.
B-36H
Same as B-36F with improved cockpit and equipment changes, 83 built.
NB-36H
One B-36H fitted with a nuclear reactor installation for trials, had a revised cockpit and raised nose. This was intended to evolve into the Convair X-6.
RB-36H
Strategic reconnaissance variant of the B-36H, 73 built.
B-36J
High altitude variant with strengthened landing gear, increased fuel capacity, armament reduced to tail guns only and reduced crew, 33 built.
YB-60
Originally designated the YB-36G, s/n 49-2676 and 49-2684. Project for a jet-powered swept wing variant. Due to the differences from a standard B-36 its designation was changed to YB-60.
Model 6
Proposed double-deck airliner marrying the fuselage of the B-36 with the wings and empennage of the YB-60; not built.

Related models

In 1951, the USAF asked Convair to build a prototype of an all-jet variant of the B-36. Convair complied by replacing the wings on a B-36F with swept wings, from which were suspended eight Pratt & Whitney XJ57-P-3 jet engines. The result was the B-36G, later renamed the Convair YB-60. The YB-60 was deemed inferior to Boeing's YB-52, and the project was terminated. Just as the C-97 was the transport variant of the B-50, the B-36 was the basis for the Convair XC-99, a double-decked military cargo plane that was the largest piston-engined, land-based aircraft ever built. Its length of  made it the longest practical aircraft of its era. The sole example built was extensively employed for nearly 10 years, especially for cross-country cargo flights during the Korean War. In 2005, this XC-99 was dismantled in anticipation of its being moved from the former Kelly Air Force Base, now the Kelly Field Annex of Lackland AFB in San Antonio, Texas, where it had been retired since 1957. The XC-99 was subsequently relocated to the National Museum of the United States Air Force at Wright-Patterson AFB for restoration, with C-5 Galaxy transports carrying pieces of the XC-99 to Wright-Patterson as space and schedule permitted.

A commercial airliner derived from the XC-99, the Convair Model 37, never left the drawing board. It would have been the first "jumbo" airliner.

Operators

United States Air Force – Strategic Air Command
2d Air Force
 72d Strategic Reconnaissance Wing – Ramey AFB, Puerto Rico (October 1952 – January 1959)
60th and 301st Strategic Reconnaissance Squadrons, Tail Code: Square F
8th Air Force
 6th Bombardment Wing – Walker AFB, New Mexico (August 1952 – August 1957)
24th, 39th and 40th Bombardment Squadrons, Tail Code: Triangle R
 7th Bombardment Wing – Carswell AFB, Texas (June 1948 – May 1958)
9th, 436th and 492d Bombardment Squadrons, Tail Code: Triangle J
 11th Bombardment Wing – Carswell AFB, Texas (December 1948 – December 1957)
26th, 42d and 98th Bombardment Squadrons, Tail Code: Triangle U
 28th Strategic Reconnaissance Wing – Ellsworth AFB, South Dakota (May 1949 – April 1950)
77th, 717th and 718th Strategic Reconnaissance Squadrons, Tail Code: Circle X
 42d Bombardment Wing, Loring AFB, Maine (April 1953 – September 1956)
69th, 70th and 75th Bombardment Squadrons
15th Air Force
 92d Bombardment Wing – Fairchild AFB, Washington (July 1951 – March 1956)
325th, 326th and 327th Bombardment Squadrons, Tail Code: Circle W
 95th Bombardment Wing – Biggs AFB, Texas (August 1953 – February 1959)
334th, 335th and 336th Bombardment Squadrons
 5th Strategic Reconnaissance Wing – Fairfield-Suisun AFB (later Travis AFB), California (January 1951 – September 1958)
5th, 31st and 72d Strategic Reconnaissance Squadrons, Tail Code: Circle X
 9th Strategic Reconnaissance Wing – Fairfield-Suisun AFB, California (May 1949 – April 1950)
1st Bombardment Squadron
 99th Strategic Reconnaissance Wing – Fairchild AFB, Washington (August 1951 – September 1956)
346th, 347th and 348th Strategic Reconnaissance Squadrons, Tail Code: Circle I

Note: SAC eliminated tail codes in 1953.

Surviving aircraft
 only four complete B-36 type aircraft survive from the original 384 produced.
RB-36H

 AF Ser. No. 51-13730 is at Castle Air Museum at the former Castle Air Force Base in Atwater, California. It was previously displayed at the former Chanute Air Force Base in Rantoul, Illinois from 1957 to 1991.

B-36J

 AF Ser. No. 52-2217 is at the Strategic Air Command and Aerospace Museum, formerly located at Offutt Air Force Base, and now off-base near Ashland, Nebraska.
 AF Ser. No. 52-2220 is at the National Museum of the United States Air Force at Wright-Patterson Air Force Base. Its flight to the museum from Davis–Monthan Air Force Base in Arizona on 30 April 1959 was the last flight of a B-36. This B-36J replaced the former Air Force Museum's original YB-36, AF Serial Number 42-13571 (see above). This was also the first aircraft to be placed in the museum's new display hangar, and was not moved again until relocated to the museum's latest addition in 2003. It is displayed alongside the only surviving example of the massive  lower main gear strut, single wheel and tire that was used on the original XB-36.
 AF Ser. No. 52-2827 is at the Pima Air and Space Museum, adjacent to Davis–Monthan Air Force Base in Tucson, Arizona. This aircraft was the final B-36 built, named The City of Fort Worth, and lent to the city of Fort Worth on 12 February 1959. It sat on the field at the Greater Southwest International Airport until that airfield was closed and the property was redeveloped as a business park adjacent to Dallas/Fort Worth International Airport. Some attempts were made to begin restoration at that location through the early 1970s. It then moved to the short-lived Southwest Aerospace Museum, which was located between the former Carswell Air Force Base (now Naval Air Station Joint Reserve Base Fort Worth) and the former General Dynamics (now Lockheed Martin) assembly plant, where it was originally built; some restoration took place while at the plant. As Lockheed Martin had no place to display the finished aircraft, and local community efforts in Fort Worth to build a facility to house and maintain the massive aircraft fell short, the NMUSAF retook possession of the aircraft and it was transported to Tucson for loan to the Pima Air and Space Museum. It was fully restored and reassembled at that museum, just south of Davis–Monthan AFB, and is displayed at that location.

Notable incidents and accidents
Though the B-36 had a solid overall safety record, well above average for the class and time, 10 B-36s were involved in accidents between 1949 and 1954 (three B-36Bs, three B-36Ds, and four B-36Hs). A total of 32 B-36s were written off in accidents between 1949 and 1957 of 385 built. When a crash occurred, the magnesium-rich airframe burned easily.

On 14 February 1950 off the northwest coast of British Columbia on Princess Royal Island, 17 crewmen parachuted from their blazing B-36B; 12 crewmen were found with one injured, and five were reported missing.

On Labor Day, Monday, 1 September 1952, a tornado hit Carswell Air Force Base, Fort Worth, damaging aircraft of the 7th and 11th Bomber Wings' complement of B-36s. Some two-thirds of the USAF's entire B-36 fleet was affected, as well as six aircraft being built at that point at Convair's Fort Worth plant. The base was shut down and operations transferred to Meacham Field. Joint repairs by Convair and the USAF got 10 of the 61 B-36s running within two weeks and repaired the other 51 aircraft within five weeks; 18 of 19 heavily damaged aircraft (and the six damaged and unfinished aircraft at Convair) were repaired by May 1953. The 19th (#2051) had to be scrapped, and was used as a nuclear testing site ground target. One heavily damaged aircraft (#5712) was written off and rebuilt as the NB-36H Nuclear Reactor Testbed aircraft.

On 18 March 1953, RB-36H-25, 51-13721, flew off course in bad weather and crashed near Burgoyne's Cove, Newfoundland, Canada. Brigadier General Richard Ellsworth was among the 23 airmen killed in the crash.

B-36s were involved in two "Broken Arrow" incidents. On 13 February 1950, B-36 serial number 44-92075, crashed in an unpopulated region of British Columbia, resulting in the first loss of an American atom bomb. The bomb's plutonium core was dummy lead, but it did have TNT, and it detonated over the ocean before the crew bailed out. Locating the crash site took some effort. After investigation, the Royal Canadian Navy determined that it was not the lost bomb. Later in 1954, the airframe, stripped of sensitive material, was substantially destroyed in situ by a U.S. military recovery team.

On 22 May 1957, a B-36 accidentally dropped a Mark 17 thermonuclear bomb  from the control tower while landing at Kirtland Air Force Base in Albuquerque, New Mexico. The weapon had come loose from its mount and fell through the bomb bay doors, creating a large hole in the bottom of the aircraft, and sending the aircraft into an uncontrollable climb due to the sudden and unexpected loss of weight. Only the conventional explosives detonated, as the bomb was unarmed. The aircraft made a safe landing. These incidents were classified for decades. See list of military nuclear accidents.

Specifications (B-36J-III)

Notable appearances in media

In 1949, the B-36 was featured in the documentary film, Target: Peace, about the operations of the 7th Bombardment Wing at Carswell AFB. Other scenes included B-36 production at the Fort Worth plant.

Strategic Air Command is a 1955 American film starring James Stewart as a Major League Baseball star and World War II veteran who is called back to active duty to become a B-36 pilot and flight commander for SAC.

The documentary Lost Nuke (2004) chronicles a 2003 Canadian expedition that set out to solve the mystery of the world's first lost nuclear weapon. The team traveled to the remote mountain site of the 1950 British Columbia B-36 crash.

See also

References

Notes

Citations

Bibliography
 Barlow, Jeffrey G. Revolt of the Admirals: The Fight for Naval Aviation, 1945–1950. Washington, D.C.: Naval Historical Center, 1994. .
 Ford, Daniel. "B-36: Bomber at the Crossroads". Air and Space/Smithsonian, April 1996. Retrieved: 3 February 2007.
 Grant, R.G. and John R. Dailey. Flight: 100 Years of Aviation. Harlow, Essex, UK: DK Adult, 2007. .
 Jacobsen, Meyers K. Convair B-36: A Comprehensive History of America's "Big Stick". Atglen, Pennsylvania: Schiffer Military History, 1997. .
 Jacobsen, Meyers K. Convair B-36: A Photo Chronicle. Atglen, Pennsylvania: Schiffer Military History, 1999. .
 Jacobsen, Meyers K. "Peacemaker." Airpower, Vol. 4, No. 6, November 1974.
 Jacobsen, Meyers K. and Ray Wagner. B-36 in Action (Aircraft in Action Number 42). Carrollton, Texas: Squadron/Signal Publications Inc., 1980. .
 Jenkins, Dennis R. B-36 Photo Scrapbook. St. Paul, Minnesota: Specialty Press Publishers and Wholesalers, 2003. .
 Jenkins, Dennis R. Convair B-36 Peacemaker. St. Paul, Minnesota: Specialty Press Publishers and Wholesalers, 1999. .
 Jenkins, Dennis R. Magnesium Overcast: The Story of the Convair B-36. North Branch, Minnesota: Specialty Press, 2002., .
 Johnsen, Frederick A. Thundering Peacemaker, the B-36 Story in Words and Pictures. Tacoma, Washington: Bomber Books, 1978.
 Knaack, Marcelle Size. Encyclopedia of U.S. Air Force aircraft and missile systems  Volume II: Post-World War II Bombers, 1945–1973. Washington, DC: Office of Air Force History, 1988. .Online - via media.defense.gov
 Leach, Norman S. Broken Arrow: America's First Lost Nuclear Weapon. Calgary, Alberta: Red Deer Press, 2008. .
 Miller, Jay and Roger Cripliver. "B-36: The Ponderous Peacemaker." Aviation Quarterly, Vol. 4, No. 4, 1978.
 Miller, Jay. "Tip Tow & Tom-Tom". Air Enthusiast, No. 9, February–May 1979, pp. 40–42. .
 Morris, Lt. Col. (ret.) and Ted Allan. "Flying the Aluminum and Magnesium Overcast". The collected articles and photographs of Ted A. Morris, 2000. Retrieved: 4 September 2006.
 Orman, Edward W. "One Thousand on Top: A Gunner's View of Flight from the Scanning Blister of a B-36." Airpower, Vol. 17, No. 2, March 1987.
 Puryear, Edgar. Stars in Flight. Novato, California: Presidio Press, 1981. 
 Pyeatt, Don. B-36: Saving the Last Peacemaker (Third Edition). Fort Worth, Texas: ProWeb Publishing, 2006. .
 Shiel, Walter P. "The B-36 Peacemaker: 'There Aren't Programs Like This Anymore'". cessnawarbirds.com. Retrieved: 19 July 2009.
 Taylor, John W.R. "Convair B-36." Combat Aircraft of the World from 1909 to the present. New York: G.P. Putnam's Sons, 1969. .
 Thomas, Tony. A Wonderful Life: The Films and Career of James Stewart. Secaucus, New Jersey: Citadel Press, 1988. .
 Wagner, Ray. American Combat Planes. New York: Doubleday & Company, Inc., 1968. .
 Wilson, Stewart. Combat Aircraft since 1945. London: Aerospace Publications, 2000. .
 Winchester, Jim. "Convair B-36". Military Aircraft of the Cold War (The Aviation Factfile). Rochester, Kent, UK: The Grange plc., 2006. .
 Wolk, Herman S. Fulcrum of Power: Essays on the United States Air Force and National Security. Darby, Pennsylvania: Diane Publishing, 2003. .
 Yenne, Bill. "Convair B-36 Peacemaker." International Air Power Review, Vol. 13, Summer 2004. London: AirTime Publishing Inc., 2004. .

External links

 USAF Museum: XB-36
 USAF Museum: B-36A
 Video of The B-36 from Strategic Air Command. 5:32
 "I Flew with the Atomic Bombers", Popular Mechanics, April 1954, pp. 98–102, 264.
 AeroWeb: B-36 versions and survivors
 "Race For the Superbomb: Lt. Gen. James Edmundson interview transcript: Flying B-36 and B-47 planes". PBS Online.
 ZiaNet: B-36 operations Walker AFB Roswell New Mexico 1955–1957
 "I Flew Thirty-One Hours in a B-36", Popular Mechanics, September 1950
 Size 36, 1950-produced "first public film" on the B-36, in detail

 
B-36
B-36
Convair B-36
Six-engined pusher aircraft
Aircraft with auxiliary jet engines
Articles containing video clips
Shoulder-wing aircraft
Aircraft first flown in 1946
Ten-engined aircraft